The 2014–15 NCHL season started with the absence of two teams, causing the league to revisit the schedule just prior to the puck drop on October 17, 2014.

Standings

Statistical leaders

Scoring leaders 

Players are listed by points, then goals.

Note: GP = Games played; G = Goals; A = Assists; Pts. = Points; PIM = Penalty minutes

Goaltenders 

These are the goaltenders that lead the league in GAA that have played at least 3 games.

Note: GP = Games played; W = Wins; L = Losses; SO = Shutouts; GAA = Goals against average; A = Assists; PIM = Penalty Minutes

2015 NCHL playoffs 

Upon completion of the 2014-15 regular season, the Westlock Warriors had a 1st round bye, while the remaining teams began the best of 5 series. The Westlock Warriors faced off against the Devon Barons in the final round of the playoffs to advance to the Senior AA Alberta Provincials held in Camrose, Alberta, March 27-29. In a surprising turn of events, the Devon Barons were selected to be a wild card for provincials, as the North Peace Hockey League did not have a representative going.

References

Ice hockey leagues in Alberta